The Jetsons: Invasion of the Planet Pirates is a 1994 platform game for the Super Nintendo Entertainment System based on the animated sitcom The Jetsons.

Gameplay

Captain Zoom informs George while he was traveling to work that Zora, the leader of the space pirates, is planning on looting the Solar System of all of its resources. George has to go through nine stages of intergalactic action in order to stop the pirates using a special device known as a  Pneumo Osmatic Precipitator (P.O.P.). This device allows George to hold on to items and breathe underwater.

There are various boss fights with machinery. With a high enough score, the player goes into a bonus stage where items must be collected before time runs out. Players must also travel through tubes to get from one part of the level to another. A speed chase level is also included in one of the levels of the game.

Development
The Jetsons: Invasion of the Planet Pirates was originally released in North America by Taito. Sting Entertainment developed it, with Hideki Takahagi as the main music composer for the Jetsons game, using Mitsuhito Tanaka's primary sound driver for Sting. This game was considered the very last one that used Mitsuhito Tanaka's primary sound driver for Sting until they were ordered by Square Co. Ltd to get rid of the sound driver and create a brand new one for Treasure Hunter G.

Reception
GamePro gave the game a negative review, summarizing, "if you liked The Jetsons ... then you might be able to wade through this game. Intermediate gamers need not apply much to this one, though. The Jetsons game is basic hop-n-bop, space-style, but it seems like all the other hop-n-boppers out there." Electronic Gaming Monthly rated the game at 6.4/10, praising it as "a faithful cartoon animation, with good graphics and character animations", but criticized the awkwardness of the suction cup attack.

Yōkai Buster: Ruka no Daibōken
In 1995, Kadokawa Shoten created a new mascot character called Yōkai Buster Ruka for the magazine Marukatsu Super Famicom. The company wanted Sting to reprogram and edit The Jetsons: Invasion of the Planet Pirates into a new game called  with new music (composed by Mitsuhito Tanaka), new enemies and new areas. Both versions have essentially the same engine with a different story and theme. They also have a strict time limit that punishes tardiness with lost lives.

The player takes control of Ruka-chan, an aggressive demon girl who lives in a world filled with harmful monsters. Much of her past is shrouded in mystery and her age is deliberately hidden in context. She lives a long life but has the mentality of a 13-year-old girl. Compared to the futuristic setting of The Jetsons, the Japanese version uses a contemporary setting with Japanese architecture. Extra features were added into the Japanese version including an extra underwater level, a mini-game, and a training mode.

See also
 The Jetsons: Cogswell's Caper!
 List of Hanna-Barbera-based video games

References

External links
The Jetsons: Invasion of the Planet Pirates at MobyGames

1994 video games
Kadokawa Shoten games
Platform games
Single-player video games
Sting Entertainment games
Super Nintendo Entertainment System games
Super Nintendo Entertainment System-only games
Taito games
Video games based on The Jetsons
Video games featuring female protagonists
Cartoon Network video games
Video games developed in Japan